During the Napoleonic Wars, the Anglo-Russian War (2 September 1807 – 18 July 1812) was the phase of hostilities between Great Britain and Russia after the latter signed the Treaty of Tilsit that ended its war with France. Anglo-Russian hostilities were limited primarily to minor naval actions in the Baltic Sea and Barents Sea.

Treaty of Tilsit

After Napoleon Bonaparte defeated the Russians at the Battle of Friedland (14 June 1807), Tsar Alexander I of Russia signed a peace treaty, known as the Treaty of Tilsit. Although the treaty was quite unpopular within the Russian court, Russia had no alternative as Napoleon could easily cross the Neman River (then the Russian border) and invade Russia.

The terms of the treaty obliged Russia to cease her maritime trade with Great Britain. This closure was a part of Napoleon's continuing efforts to establish the Continental System, strengthening economic ties between the different countries in Europe under French domination. Napoleon's objective was to close one of Britain's most important markets and thus force it economically into submission.

Military activities
On 26 October 1807, Emperor of all the Russias Alexander formally declared war on the United Kingdom after the British attack on Copenhagen in September 1807. He did not actively prosecute the war; Alexander instead restricted Russia's contribution to the bare requirement to close off trade. The British, understanding his position, limited their military response to the declaration. However, there were a few notable incidents.

Detention of Russian vessels
The official news did not arrive in Britain until 2 December, at which point the British declared an embargo on all Russian vessels in British ports. Some 70 vessels shared in the seizure of the 44-gun Russian frigate Speshnoy (Speshnyy), then in Portsmouth harbour. The Russian storeship Wilhelmina (Vilgemina) was also seized at the same time.

Speshnyy had sailed from Kronstadt with the payroll for Vice-Admiral Dmitry Senyavin’s squadron in the Mediterranean, together with Vilgemina. Vilgemina was slower but caught up with Speshnyy at Portsmouth. A portion of their cargo found on board consisted of 601,167 Spanish doubloons and 140,197 Dutch ducats. Consequently, an able seaman on any one of the 70 British vessels in the harbour received 14s 7½d in prize money.

Lisbon Incident
In August 1807, Senyavin was ordered to bring his fleet from the Mediterranean to the Baltic, where the Finnish War with Sweden was already brewing. He set sail from Corfu on 19 September and although he planned to proceed directly to Saint Petersburg, stormy weather forced him to take refuge in the Tagus River and cast anchor in Lisbon on 30 October. Within days, John VI of Portugal had fled to the Portuguese colony of Brazil and the Royal Navy blockaded Lisbon, intercepting a Russian sloop as an enemy vessel because the Anglo-Russian War had been declared. In November, French forces under the Duc d'Abrantès overran Lisbon.

Senyavin, placed in a delicate diplomatic position, proceeded to distinguish himself as a diplomat. He declared himself neutral and managed to protect his ships from seizure. In August 1808 the Duke of Wellington defeated the French at Vimeiro, which forced them to leave Portugal. Senyavin's seven ships of the line and one frigate were left face to face with fifteen British ships of the line and ten frigates. Senyavin maintained his neutrality, threatening to blow up his ships and destroy Lisbon in case of attack. Eventually, he signed a convention with Admiral Sir Charles Cotton, whereby the Royal Navy was to escort the Russian squadron to London, with the Russians still flying their flags. Moreover, Senyavin was to assume supreme command of the joint Anglo-Russian fleet (as the senior officer of the two). Two Russian ships (Rafail and Yaroslav) were left in Lisbon for repairs.

On 31 August Senyavin's squadron left Portugal for Portsmouth. On 27 September the Admiralty was informed that enemy vessels had cast anchor in Portsmouth, with their flags streaming, as if in times of peace. The British detained the Russian fleet in Portsmouth under various pretexts until winter weather made their return to the Baltic impossible. The British insisted that Senyavin squadron should sail to Arkhangelsk, or else they would be intercepted by the waiting Swedish fleet. In 1809, the departure was further delayed by the disastrous Walcheren Expedition. Finally, on 5 August the Russian fleet was allowed to leave Portsmouth for Riga, where they arrived on 9 September 1809.

Naval conflict in the Baltic
Russia also invaded Sweden, then a close ally to Great Britain, in 1808. But it was unlikely related to Britain and the Treaty, as the two countries already were at odds at the time. British men-of-war supported the Swedish fleet during the Finnish War and had victories over the Russians in the Gulf of Finland in July 1808 and August 1809.

In May 1808 the British sent a fleet under Vice-Admiral Sir James Saumarez to the Baltic. The British 44-gun frigate  captured the Russian cutter Opyt on  1808 after her captain and crew put up heroic resistance. The action took place off Nargen island (now Naissaar), which defends Reval from the sea. The Admiralty took Opyt into service as HMS Baltic.

Centaur and Implacable vs. Vsevolod

On 9 July, the Russian fleet, under Admiral Peter Khanykov, came out from Kronstadt. The Swedes massed a fleet under Swedish Admiral Rudolf Cederström, consisting of 11 line-of-battle ships and 5 frigates at Örö and Jungfrusund to oppose them. They chased two Russian frigates on the 19th and joined the Swedes the following day.

On 22 August, the Russian fleet, consisting of nine ships of the line, five large frigates and six smaller ones, moved from Hanko to threaten the Swedes. The Swedes, with the two British ships, grouped at Örö, and three days later sailed to meet the Russians.

The Russians and the Anglo-Swedish force were fairly evenly matched, but the Russians retreated and the Allied ships followed them. Centaur and Implacable were better vessels than the Swedish ships and slowly pulled ahead, with Implacable catching up with a Russian straggler, the 74-gun Vsevolod, under Captain Daniil Rudnev (or Roodneff). Eventually, and after heavy casualties, Vsevolod struck. In 1847 the Admiralty awarded the Naval General Service Medal with clasps "Implacable 26 Augt. 1808" and "Centaur 26 Augt. 1808" to the surviving claimants (41 per vessel) from the action.

Vice-Admiral Saumerez with his entire squadron joined the Anglo-Swedish squadron the next day. They then blockaded Khanykov's squadron for some months. After the British and the Swedes abandoned the blockade, the Russian fleet was able to return to Kronstadt.

Boat actions

Among the captured vessels were Russian gun boats No.5, No.10, No. 13, and No.15. In 1847 the Admiralty issued the Naval General Service Medal with clasp "7 July Boat Service 1809" to 33 surviving claimants from the action.

Captain Forrest of Prometheus commanded the boats and succeeded in capturing gunboats Nos. 62, 65, and 66, and the transport brig No. 11. The action was sanguinary in that the British lost 19 men killed and 51 wounded, and the Russians lost 28 men killed and 59 wounded. In 1847 the Admiralty issued the Naval General Service Medal with clasp "25 July Boat Service 1809" to 35 surviving claimants from the action.

However the successes of the Russian army on land forced Sweden to sign a peace treaty with Russia in 1809 whereby, inter alia, Sweden ceded the later Grand Duchy of Finland to Russia. Sweden sued for peace with France in 1810 and then formally joined the blockade against Britain as required by the Continental System. Sweden kept trading with Britain and the Royal Navy kept using Swedish ports.

Naval raids in the Barents Sea
In time, the Anglo-Russian War overlapped with the Gunboat War against Denmark-Norway, leading the British to expand their trade embargo to Russian waters and to forays by the British navy northwards into the Barents Sea. The navy conducted raids on Hasvik and Hammerfest and disrupted the Pomor trade, the Norwegian trade with Russia.

In June 1809 HMS Nyaden participated in one or two actions. First, her boats conducted a night raid on Kildin Island that wiped out a Russian garrison. Boats from Nyaden also captured some 22-3 coastal trading vessels in the Kola River, many upriver from the present city of Murmansk. Nyaden also took several other Russian vessels at sea as prizes.

Nyaden was probably the vessel whose boats in July took possession of Catherine Harbour, in the ostrog, or fortified settlement, of Kola. The British also commandeered all the stores belonging to the White Sea Company (est. 1803 at Archangelsk). The Times reported that this was the first British engagement in Russian territory, news of the actions on Kildin Island either being subsumed or overlooked.

British naval involvement in the region continued into 1811. On 3 August 1810, the brig  captured the St. Peder. Next year, on 2 January, Gallant captured the Danish privateer Restorateur off the Norwegian coast. Restorateur was armed with six 12-pounder guns and had a crew of 19 men. Four months later, on 5 April, Gallant captured the Victoria. Then on 1 August 1811, the frigate , which was operating out of the Lieth station, captured the Russian vessels Michael, Ivan Isasima, and St. Oluff, and their cargoes.

Persia 
During the Russo-Persian War (1804–1813), several British officers, part of Sir John Malcolm's 1809 embassy to Persia, remained in that country, providing training to the reforming Persian army. One of the British officers, William Monteith, accompanied Abbas Mirza on his unsuccessful campaign in Georgia and then commanded a frontier force and the garrison of Erivan.

Outcome
Alexander I kept Russia as neutral as possible in the ongoing French war with Britain. He allowed Russians to continue secretly to trade with Britain and did not enforce the blockade required by Continental System. In 1810 he withdrew Russia from the Continental System and trade between Britain and Russia grew.

Franco-Russian relations became progressively worse after 1810. By 1811, it became clear that Napoleon was not keeping to his side of the terms of the Treaty of Tilsit. He had promised assistance to Russia in its war against the Ottoman Empire, but as the campaign went on, France offered no support at all.

With war imminent between France and Russia, Alexander started to prepare the ground diplomatically. In April 1812 Russia and Sweden signed an agreement for mutual defence. A month later Alexander secured his southern flank by the Treaty of Bucharest (1812), which formally ended the war against Turkey.

After Napoleon invaded Russia in June, the British and the Russians signed one Treaty of Orebro on 18 July 1812; on that same day and in the same place the British and Swedes signed another Treaty of Orebro ending the Anglo-Swedish War (1810–1812), a war that had had no engagements and no casualties.

References

Sources

Further reading
 The Napoleonic Wars, Osprey Publishing

External links
 The Coalition Wars

Russia 1807
Wars involving Russia
Napoleonic Wars
Conflicts in 1807
Conflicts in 1808
Conflicts in 1809
Conflicts in 1810
Conflicts in 1811
Conflicts in 1812
Russia–United Kingdom military relations